This is a list of properties and districts in Charlton County, Georgia that are listed on the National Register of Historic Places (NRHP).

Current listings

|}

References

Charlton
Buildings and structures in Charlton County, Georgia